4-Methoxyphencyclidine (methoxydine, 4-MeO-PCP) is a dissociative anesthetic drug that has been sold online as a research chemical. The synthesis of 4-MeO-PCP was first reported in 1965 by the Parke-Davis medicinal chemist Victor Maddox. A 1999 review published by a chemist using the pseudonym John Q. Beagle suggested the potency of 4-MeO-PCP in man was reduced relative to PCP, two years later Beagle published a detailed description of the synthesis and qualitative effects of 4-MeO-PCP, which he said possessed 70% the potency of PCP. 4-MeO-PCP was the first arylcyclohexylamine research chemical to be sold online, it was introduced in late 2008 by a company trading under the name CBAY and was followed by several related compounds such as 3-MeO-PCP and methoxetamine. 4-MeO-PCP has lower affinity for the NMDA receptor than PCP, but higher affinity than ketamine, it is orally active in a dosage range similar to ketamine, with some users requiring doses in excess of 100 mg for desired effects. Users have reported substantial differences in active dose, these discrepancies can be partially explained by the presence of unreacted PCC and other impurities in samples sold on the grey market. 4-MeO-PCP has Ki values of 404 nM for the NMDA receptor, 713 nM for the norepinephrine transporter, 844 nM for the serotonin transporter, 296 nM for the σ1 receptor and 143 nM for the σ2 receptor.

4-MeO-PCP hydrochloride is a white crystalline solid with a melting point of 181-182 °C

Side effects

4-MeO-PCP has caused a fatality in combination with 4-HO-MET, venlafaxine, olanzapine, lorazepam and hydroxyzine.

Legality

On October 18, 2012 the Advisory Council on the Misuse of Drugs in the United Kingdom released a report about methoxetamine, saying that the "harms of methoxetamine are commensurate with Class B of the Misuse of Drugs Act (1971)", despite the fact that the act does not classify drugs based on harm. The report went on to suggest that all analogues of MXE should also become class B drugs and suggested a catch-all clause covering both existing and unresearched arylcyclohexamines, including 4-MeO-PCP.

Sweden's public health agency suggested classifying 4-MeO-PCP as hazardous substance on November 10, 2014.

As per Chile's Ley de drogas, aka Ley 20000, all esters and ethers of PCP are illegal. As 4-MeO-PCP is an ether of PCP, it is thus illegal.

See also
 Arylcyclohexylamine
 3-HO-PCP
 3-MeO-PCE
 3-MeO-PCMo
 3-MeO-PCP
 MDPCP
 Methoxetamine
 Methoxyketamine

References

Arylcyclohexylamines
Dissociative drugs
1-Piperidinyl compounds
Phenol ethers
Designer drugs
NMDA receptor antagonists